The ornate tree frog (Boana ornatissima) is a species of frogs in the family Hylidae found in Brazil, Colombia, French Guiana, Guyana, Suriname, and Venezuela. Its natural habitats are subtropical or tropical moist lowland forests, freshwater marshes, and intermittent freshwater marshes.

References

ornatissima
Amphibians of Brazil
Amphibians of Colombia
Amphibians of French Guiana
Amphibians of Guyana
Amphibians of Suriname
Amphibians of Venezuela
Amphibians described in 1923
Taxonomy articles created by Polbot